Tatriella is a genus of annelids belonging to the family Lumbriculidae.

The species of this genus are found in Europe.

Species:
 Tatriella longiatriata Popčenko, 1976 
 Tatriella slovenica Hrabĕ, 1939

References

Lumbriculidae